1982 Dakar Rally also known as the 1982 Paris–Dakar Rally was the 4th running of the Dakar Rally event. 382 competitors took part. The brothers, Claude Marreau and Bernard Marreau, won for the Renault team while Cyril Neveu won the motorcycle category for the Honda team.

Stages

Results

Cars

Bikes

Trucks

References

Dakar Rally
D
1982 in French motorsport
1982 in African sport